South O'Brien Community School District is a rural public school district headquartered in Paullina, Iowa. Its junior and senior high school is also in Paullina, while the preschool through elementary school is in Primghar.

It is mostly in O'Brien County, with small sections in Clay and Cherokee counties. It serves the municipalities of Paullina, Primghar, Calumet, and Sutherland. It also serves the unincorporated areas of Gaza and Germantown as well as other  areas.

History
The district was formed on July 1, 1993, by the merger of three school districts: Paullina, Primghar, and Sutherland.

Dan Moore began his term as a superintendent in 2009; in 2019 he announced plans to retire by summer 2020, making him the longest-serving superintendent in the district's history.

Schools
The district operates two schools:
South O'Brien Elementary School, Primghar
South O'Brien Secondary School, Paulina

South O'Brien High School

Athletics
The Wolverines compete in the War Eagle Conference in the following sports:
Cross Country
Volleyball
Football
Basketball
 2016 Class 1A State Champions
Wrestling
Track and Field
Golf 
Baseball
 2004 Class 2A State Runner-up  
Softball

See also
List of school districts in Iowa
List of high schools in Iowa

References

External links
 South O'Brien Community School District
 

School districts in Iowa
Education in Cherokee County, Iowa
Education in Clay County, Iowa
Education in O'Brien County, Iowa
1993 establishments in Iowa
School districts established in 1993